Adam David Rhodes Kay (born 1 March 1992) is an English former footballer and assistant coach for USL League Two side Des Moines Menace.

Early life
Kay was born in Bath, Somerset, attending Wellsway School.

Career

Bristol Rovers
He was promoted to the senior squad during the 2007–08 season after progressing through the youth ranks at the club and was handed the squad number 25 and named as a substitute on 29 December 2007 for the home game against Bristol City.

He moved to League 2 side Accrington Stanley on 20 March 2009 until the end of the season. On 21 August 2009, Kay joined Chester on loan until January 2010 along with Chris Lynch. During his loan spell with Chester, he played 15 league matches and scored no goals.

Stalybridge Celtic
On 17 September 2010, Kay signed a contract with Conference North side Stalybridge Celtic and made his debut for the club the following day in the 1–3 defeat away at Solihull Moors.

He joined Radcliffe Borough on loan in December 2011.

USA
In 2011, Kay went America to study at Southwestern Christian University, studying at the college for four years.
Kay, also spent time with USL PDL and NPSL teams, which saw him play for Vermont Voltage (2014), Oklahoma City FC (2012, 2013), setting a record number of appearances in the USL PDL for Vermont Voltage in a single season.

Managerial career
In 2017, Kay was appointed as head coach of National Premier Soccer League side Oklahoma City 1889. In 2019, Kay became the head coach of NAIA team Southwestern Christian University after serving from 2016 to 2019 as an assistant at Mid-American Christian University. On 15 March 2022, Kay announced that he was stepping down from OKC 1889. On 19 April 2022, SCU announced that Kay would be stepping down as head coach. He would spend the 2022 USL League Two season with Des Moines Menace. In May 2022, Kay was given the Associate Head Coach job at Davis and Elkins College.

Updated as of 19 April 2022

Honours

OKC 1889 FC
 UPSL Central Conference Spring Playoff Championship: 2019
Southwestern Christian University
 Sooner Athletic Conference Regular Season Championship: 2020
 NCCAA Central Region Championship: 2021

Individual
 Sooner Athletic Conference Coach of the Year: 2020

References

External links
Adam Kaye profile at burnleyfootballclub.com

1990 births
Living people
Footballers from Burnley
English footballers
Burnley F.C. players
Accrington Stanley F.C. players
Chester City F.C. players
English Football League players
Stalybridge Celtic F.C. players
Northern Premier League players
Radcliffe F.C. players
Association football midfielders
English expatriate footballers
English expatriate sportspeople in the United States